Firuz Kola or Firuz Kala may refer to:
 Firuz Kola-ye Olya (disambiguation)
 Firuz Kola-ye Sofla (disambiguation)
 Firuz Kola-ye Vosta